The oil campaign chronology of World War II lists bombing missions and related events regarding the petroleum/oil/lubrication (POL) facilities that supplied Nazi Germany or those Germany tried to capture in Operation Edelweiss.

Legend
 — events regarding Nazi Germany petroleum, lubrication, and/or oil supplies
 - events regarding notable Luftwaffe defensive efforts against Allied attack of petroleum, lubrication, and/or oil supply targets
 and/or  — events regarding Allied planning
  — RAF, Eighth Air Force, and other roundels indicate units (most listings are from the RAF chronology and the USAAF chronology)
"100 BG" — listings that include the unit abbreviation (BG is Bombardment Group) are from the corresponding mission history for the unit.

Notes
Notes

Citations

References
 
 May-June 1940 (Battle of France), June-October (Battle of Britain) 1940, July-December 1940
 1941: January-April, May-August, September- December
 1942: January, February, March, April, May, June, July, August, September, October, November, December
 1943: January, February, March, April, May, June, July, August, September, October, November, December
 1944: January, February, March, April, May, June, (D-Day), July, August, September, October, November, December
 January 1945, February 1945, March 1945, April 1945
 
 1942: January, February, March, April, May, June, July, August, September, October, November, December
 1943: January, February, March,  April, May, June, July, August, September, October, November, December
 1944: January, February, March, April, May, June, July, August, September, October, November, December
 January 1945, February 1945, March 1945, April 1945, May 1945, June 1945, July 1945, August 1945, September 1945
 92 BG missions
 
 32nd Bombardment Squadron missions 
 303rdBG.com, 397 BG
 
 384th bombardment group
 
 401st bombardment group 401BG.com,
 cybercity,
 
 Cottontails
 452 BG
 461st.org,
 zplace2b
 485thBG.org
 486th.org
 487thBG.com